The molecular formula C20H23N7O7 (molar mass: 473.44 g/mol, exact mass: 473.1659 u) may refer to:

 Folinic acid
 10-Formyltetrahydrofolate (10-CHO-THF)

Molecular formulas